The 2007 Big 12 Conference women's basketball championship, known for sponsorship reasons as the 2007 Phillips 66 Big 12 Women's Basketball Championship, was the 2007 edition of the Big 12 Conference's championship tournament.  The tournament was held at the Cox Convention Center in Oklahoma City from 6 March until 10 March 2007.  The Quarterfinals, Semifinals, and Finals were televised on FSN. The championship game, held on March 10, 2007, featured the Oklahoma Sooners and the Iowa State Cyclones. The Sooners won 67–60.

Seeding

Schedule

Tournament bracket

See also
2007 Big 12 Conference men's basketball tournament
2007 NCAA Women's Division I Basketball Tournament
2006–07 NCAA Division I women's basketball rankings

References

+
Big 12 Conference women's basketball tournament
Tournament
Big 12 Conference women's basketball tournament
Big 12 Conference women's basketball tournament